Maike Diekmann (born 19 July 1994) is a Namibian rower. She competed in the women's single sculls event at the 2020 Summer Olympics.

She began rowing during her third year attending Rhodes University in South Africa and represented Namibia for the first time at the 2015 African Olympic Qualification Regatta held in Tunisia.

References

External links
 

1994 births
Living people
Namibian female rowers
Olympic rowers of Namibia
Rowers at the 2020 Summer Olympics
Rhodes University alumni
People from Otjiwarongo